Dilation and evacuation (D&E) is the dilation of the cervix and surgical evacuation of the uterus (potentially including the fetus, placenta and other tissue) after the first trimester of pregnancy. It is a  method of abortion as well as a common procedure used after miscarriage to remove all pregnancy tissue.

In various health care centers it may be called by different names:
 D&E (Dilation and evacuation)
 ERPOC (Evacuation of Retained Products of Conception)
 TOP or STOP ((Surgical) Termination Of Pregnancy)

D&E normally refers to a specific second trimester procedure. However, some sources use the term D&E to refer more generally to any procedure that involves the processes of dilation and evacuation, which includes the first trimester procedures of manual and electric vacuum aspiration. Intact Dilation and Extraction (D&X) is a different procedural variation on D&E.

Indications for D&E
Dilation and evacuation (D&E) is one of the methods available to completely remove the fetus and all of the placental tissue in the uterus after the first trimester of pregnancy. A D&E may be performed for a surgical abortion, or for surgical management of a miscarriage.

Abortion 
Induced abortion after the first trimester of pregnancy  is rare. Approximately 630,000 abortions were performed in the US in 2015, the most recent year for which data are available. Fewer than 10% of all abortions in the United States are performed after 13 weeks of gestation, and just over 1% are performed after 21 weeks gestation. In the United States, 95–99% of abortions after the first trimester of pregnancy are performed by surgical abortion via dilation and evacuation.

People who do not have access to affordable abortion care in their area or who face legal restrictions to obtaining a wanted abortion may wait longer to get an abortion after they make the decision to terminate their pregnancy. When an abortion is delayed, a D&E may be necessary.

Miscarriage 
Dilation and evacuation can be offered for management of second trimester miscarriage if skilled providers are available. Some women choose D&E over labor induction for a second trimester loss because it can be a scheduled surgical procedure, offering predictability over labor induction, or because they find it emotionally easier than undergoing labor and delivery. Both methods offer the option of fetal and placental testing. Although pregnancy loss is emotionally distressing, there are rarely medical complications associated with a short (<1 week) delay to management.

Description of procedure

Cervical preparation 
Prior to the procedure, cervical preparation with osmotic dilators or medications is recommended in order to reduce risk of complications such as cervical laceration and to facilitate cervical dilation during the procedure. Although there is no consensus as to which method of cervical preparation is superior in terms of safety and technical ease of the procedure, one particular concern is reducing the risk of preterm birth. Concerns within the medical community have advised against or at least asked for further research concerning the safety of performing the dilation of the cervix on the same day as the surgery for some or all second trimester pregnancies. The concern is that performing the dilation too soon before the surgery could increase the risk of preterm birth should the woman ever carry a subsequent pregnancy to term.

Anesthesia options 
Most patients will be provided NSAIDs for pain management. Local anesthetics, such as lidocaine, are frequently injected by the cervix to reduce pain during the procedure. IV sedation may also be used. General anesthesia may be used depending on individual circumstances, however it is not preferred as it adds significant anesthesia risks to the procedure.

Infection prophylaxis 
Immediately prior to the procedure, antibiotics are usually administered to prevent infection.

Surgical procedure 
A speculum is placed in the vagina to allow visualization of the cervix. If osmotic dilators were placed prior to the procedure, these are removed.

The cervix may be further dilated with rigid dilator instruments (as opposed to osmotic dilators). Sufficient cervical dilation decreases the risk of morbidity, including cervical injury and uterine perforation.  Uterine contents are removed using a cannula to apply aspiration, followed by forceps. Tissue inspection ensures removal of the fetus in its entirety. The procedure may be performed under ultrasound guidance to aid in visualizing uterine anatomy and to assess if all tissue has been removed at the completion of the procedure.

The procedure usually takes less than half an hour.

Recovery 
D&E is usually performed in the outpatient setting, and the patient can be safely sent home the same day after a period of observed recovery, ranging from 45 minutes to several hours. Generally, the woman may return to work the following day. The type of anesthesia given also influences the appropriate amount of recovery time before discharge. There is rarely a need for narcotic pain medications afterwards, and NSAIDs are recommended for home pain management. Recovery from the procedure is typically fast and uncomplicated.

Some women may experience lactation after a second-trimester loss or termination of pregnancy. At this time, medications to suppress lactation are not proven to be effective.

Variations
If the fetus is removed intact, the procedure is referred to as intact dilation and extraction by the American Medical Association, and referred to as "intact dilation and evacuation" by the American Congress of Obstetricians and Gynecologists (ACOG).

Risks 
D&E is a safe procedure when performed by experienced practitioners. The rate of mortality following legal procedures in the US is 0.62 legal induced abortion-related deaths per 100,000 reported legal abortions. The strongest risk factor for mortality following abortion is increasing gestational age.

Risks of D&E include bleeding, infection, uterine perforation, and damage to surrounding organs or tissues . Hemorrhage occurs following less than 1% of all surgical abortions. Infection rates following second trimester abortion have been reported to be 0.1–4%. The risk of infection is decreased by the use of antibiotics. Rare risks of D&E include uterine perforation, retained products of conception, and rare risk of hysterectomy.

There is no evidence that surgical abortion causes an increase in infertility or adverse outcomes in subsequent pregnancies.

Alternatives

Labor induction abortion
Medical abortion 

Complication rates after D&E are similar to or lower than those of labor induction (medical abortion) after 13 weeks, though few studies exist comparing the two approaches. In certain clinical scenarios--severe anemia, for example-- D&E may be preferred over labor induction.

Law
Proposals to limit abortion access sometimes target specific procedures such as D&E, though this also restricts access for non-abortion patients, such as those with pregnancy loss. Kansas was the first state to ban D&E in 2015, later it was struck down in 2016. Currently three US states (Mississippi, Nebraska, and West Virginia) have specifically banned D&E.

See also
Late-term abortion

References

Methods of abortion
.